Alchemilla barbatiflora is an herbaceous perennial plant native to the Caucasus.

References
S. Hayırlıoâlu-Ayaz, Annales Botanici Fennici 37(3): 173-182

barbatiflora